SLM may refer to:

Companies
 SLM Corporation, or Sallie Mae, an American student loan company
 Swiss Locomotive and Machine Works
 Surinaamse Luchtvaart Maatschappij, or Surinam Airways, ICAO code
 SLM International, now known as CCM, an ice hockey equipment manufacturer
 Stan Lee Media, an Internet company
 St. Louis Music, equipment distributor

Science
 Selective laser melting, making metal parts
 Spatial light modulator in optical projection
 Standard litre per minute

Other
 Š-L-M (Shin-Lamedh-Mem), root of Semitic words
 Salamanca Airport, Spain, IATA Airport Code
 Sudan Liberation Movement
 Situational leadership model

See also